Nalžovice is a municipality and village in Příbram District in the Central Bohemian Region of the Czech Republic. It has about 600 inhabitants.

Administrative parts
Villages of Chlum, Hluboká, Nalžovické Podhájí, Nová Ves and Oboz are administrative parts of Nalžovice.

References

Villages in Příbram District